Eonju Station is a Seoul Metropolitan Subway station on Line 9. It opened in March 2015.

Station layout

Gallery

References

Seoul Metropolitan Subway stations
Metro stations in Gangnam District
Railway stations opened in 2015
2015 establishments in South Korea